Spencer Lee Thomas (born March 9, 1951) is a former American football safety in the National Football League for the Washington Redskins and the Baltimore Colts.  He played college basketball at Washburn University, but joined the Redskins after a tryout in Topeka and then later played for the Baltimore Colts.

1951 births
Living people
Sportspeople from Kansas City, Kansas
American football safeties
Washington Redskins players
Baltimore Colts players